Agnana Calabra is a comune (municipality) in the Metropolitan City of Reggio Calabria in the Italian region Calabria, located about  southwest of Catanzaro and about  northeast of Reggio Calabria.

Agnana Calabra borders the following municipalities: Canolo, Gerace, Mammola, Siderno.

References

Cities and towns in Calabria
Articles which contain graphical timelines